These singles topped the Belgian Walloon (francophone) Ultratop 40 in 2010.

See also
2010 in music

References

Ultratop 40 number-one hits
Belgium
2010 40